Lungotevere Prati is the stretch of Lungotevere that links Via Ulpiano to Via Vittoria Colonna in the rione Prati in Rome (Italy).

Overview
The Lungotevere takes its name from the neighboring area, formerly called prata (Latin for "meadows") due to the presence of large green spaces mainly inhabited by peasants; it was established as per resolution dated July 20, 1887.

Along the Lungotevere rises the Neo-Gothic Chiesa del Sacro Cuore del Suffragio, built by Giuseppe Gualandi between 1894 and 1917.

Notes

Bibliography

External links

Prati
Streets in Rome R. XXII Prati